Dieter Engelhardt (born 24 February 1926) was a German long-distance runner. He competed in the marathon at the 1952 Summer Olympics.

References

External links
 

1926 births
Possibly living people
Place of birth missing
Athletes (track and field) at the 1952 Summer Olympics
West German male long-distance runners
West German male marathon runners
Olympic athletes of Germany